"Hands" is a song by American singer Jewel, released as the first single from her second studio album, Spirit (1998). Jewel wrote the song following an incident in which she considered stealing a sundress after getting fired from various jobs due to kidney troubles, and she decided that her hands were better suited to writing songs than stealing clothes. Written as one of the last songs for the album, the lyrics express how the smallest decisions have the power to make change. A piano-driven ballad, the song was serviced to American radio stations on October 7, 1998, ahead of its planned release date of October 19 due to a radio leak in Dallas, Texas.

No commercial single was issued in the United States, and the singles that were issued internationally received the album version. The radio edit can be found only on promos for the single. Even without a physical release, the song reached number six on the Billboard Hot 100, and the video peaked atop VH1's Top 20 Countdown. "Hands" also reached number one in Canada for one week and peaked within the top 30 in Australia, the Netherlands, and New Zealand. A "Christmas version" of the song appears on Joy: A Holiday Collection.

Background
In 2002, Jewel elaborated on the song's origin. Before she wrote "Hands", she experienced kidney troubles that prevented her from working, and as a result, she was fired from several successive jobs, sending her into poverty. She began to shoplift food but worried she would begin to steal more expensive items. One day, she noticed a sundress in a shop window and went inside to try it on, planning to steal it. However, when she noticed the price tag, she decided against it. She explained:

Jewel quickly left the store, leaving the dress behind, and began to write "Hands" soon afterwards, referring to her own hands that would function better writing songs than stealing dresses. It was one of the final tracks written and recorded for Spirit. The central lyrics that developed into the complete song were, "If you watch what your hands are doing, you can see where your life is going to go."

Composition and lyrics
Ilana Kaplan of The New York Times has described "Hands" as a ballad. The album version is three minutes and fifty-four seconds long while the radio edit is three minutes and forty-seven seconds. According to the digital sheet music published at Musicnotes, the song is written in cut time in the key of F minor with a moderate tempo of 68 beats per minute.

The lyrics of "Hands" say that all people have the power to make their own decisions and change their lives for the better as long as they keep watch on what their hands are doing. It is also about how the smallest actions can cause a difference. Jewel explained, "I knew if I could tell the world, my hands are so little, how can they have impact on the world? They seem like tiny little weapons. I can't fight with despair, thoughtlessness. They're not the solution, but they are the first step forward."

Critical reception
Chuck Taylor of Billboard noted how Jewel's lyrics were "less girlish" and "creamier and more robust" than her debut efforts on "Hands" and called the track "one hell of a new single". Music Week named it the "Single of the Week" on their October 24, 1998, issue, describing the song as "delicious" and its chorus as "moving". Conversely, AllMusic reviewer Stephen Thomas Erlewine referred to the song's lyrics as "startlingly naive".

Music video
The video, directed by Nick Brandt, begins with Jewel driving along on a rainy night when she comes across emergency workers responding to a collapsed apartment building. She gets out of her car and stands with the crowd looking at the rubble and notices other onlookers walking away in horror and hopelessness. She follows others into the rubble and helps dig through the rubble for survivors, finding a man, alive, under the rubble and later three young children trapped inside a room. Throughout the whole video, she remains calm and collected, full of hope, as chaos ensues around her.

The video was filmed at the Promenade apartment complex in West Covina, California on October 11 and 12, 1998. The apartments were vacant at the time of the filming of the video.

September 11 remix

Right after the September 11 attacks, a DJ remixed the song which was carried on stations across the country. Jewel was in the mountains with her longtime boyfriend, Ty Murray, during the attack, and she first heard this version on the radio a few days later—it was one of the first things she heard. She spoke of this experience at a Borders concert in Ann Arbor, Michigan prior to the release of Perfectly Clear. Jewel appeared on Late Show with David Letterman one week after the incident, on September 18, 2001, and performed this song instead of the previously scheduled "Standing Still."

Track listings
Australian and Japanese CD single, UK CD1
 "Hands" – 3:47
 "Innocence Maintained" – 4:08
 "Enter from the East" (acoustic) – 4:01
UK CD2
 "Hands" – 3:47
 "Who Will Save Your Soul" (live) – 4:08
 "You Were Meant for Me" (live) – 4:01

German CD single
 "Hands" – 3:47
 "Enter from the East" (acoustic) – 4:01

Credits and personnel
Credits are adapted from the German CD single liner notes and the Spirit album booklet.

Studios
 Recorded and engineered at Groove Masters (Santa Monica, California)
 Mixed at Ocean Way Recording (Hollywood, California)
 Mastered at Gateway Mastering (Portland, Maine, US)

Personnel

 Jewel Kilcher – lyrics, music, vocals, backing vocals
 Patrick Leonard – music, piano and keyboards, production
 Nedra Carroll – backing vocals
 Brian MacLeod – drums and hand drum
 Luis Conte – percussion
 Paul Bushnell – bass
 Jude Cole – acoustic guitar
 James Harrah – electric guitar
 Ross Hogarth – engineering
 Bob Salcedo – engineering assistant
 Sebastian Haimerl – engineering assistant
 Kevin Killen – mixing
 John Sorenson – mix engineering assistant
 Robi Banerji – mix engineering assistant
 David Channing – technical assistant
 Bob Ludwig – mastering
 Nedra Carroll – management
 Brenda Rotheiser – art direction
 Matthew Rolston – photography

Charts and certifications

Weekly charts

Year-end charts

Certifications

Release history

References

1990s ballads
1998 singles
1998 songs
Atlantic Records singles
Jewel (singer) songs
Music videos directed by Nick Brandt
RPM Top Singles number-one singles
Songs about poverty
Songs written by Jewel (singer)
Songs written by Patrick Leonard